John Allen Wilcox (or John Alexander Wilcox) (April 18, 1819 – February 7, 1864) was a politician from Mississippi and Texas who served in the United States House of Representatives in the early 1850s and then in the Confederate Congress during the American Civil War.

Biography
John Allen (or Alexander) Wilcox was born in Greene County, North Carolina, a son of Ruben and Sarah (Garland) Wilcox. One brother, Cadmus Wilcox, would later become a general in the Confederate States Army. It is likely that Wilcox was raised and educated in Tipton County, Tennessee, where the family moved. Moving to Mississippi and entering politics, he served as secretary of the State Senate. He enlisted in the United States Army during the Mexican–American War, serving as lieutenant colonel of the 2nd Mississippi Volunteer Infantry. When hostilities ceased, he returned to Mississippi and practiced law in Aberdeen.

In 1850, he was elected to Congress as a Whig, defeating future Civil War general Winfield S. Featherston. Two years later, Wilcox was defeated for re-election. In 1853, he moved to San Antonio, Texas, and resumed his law practice. He briefly dabbled in the Know Nothing political movement, serving as a presidential elector in 1856, but then joined the Democratic Party in 1858, attending the National Convention that year.

With talk of secession increasing in Texas, Wilcox, a strong supporter of states rights, was selected as a delegate to the state's Secession Convention in 1861. He served on the committee that drafted the ordinance of secession. He was elected to the First Confederate Congress in November 1861 and traveled to Richmond, Virginia to assume his duties, serving on various committees and proving to be a staunch support of the policies of President Jefferson Davis. He was active in helping raise recruits and organizing the Texas Brigade.

After his term in Congress expired, Wilcox joined the Confederate States Army as a volunteer aide to Maj. Gen. John B. Magruder. Given the rank of colonel, Wilcox served in the Battle of Galveston.

He was elected to the Second Confederate Congress, but died in Richmond on February 7, 1864, unexpectedly of apoplexy shortly before taking his seat. He was buried in Richmond's Hollywood Cemetery. He was reinterred in 1897 to Oak Hill Cemetery in Washington, D.C.

His wife and two young children were taken in by his brother, General Cadmus M. Wilcox.

References

Sources
Handbook of Texas Online
 Warner, Ezra J. and Yearns, W. Buck, Biographical Register of the Confederate Congress Baton Rouge: Louisiana State University Press, 1975.

External links
 
 Find A Grave (as "John Allen Wilcox")

1819 births
1864 deaths
People from Greene County, North Carolina
Confederate States Army officers
Members of the Confederate House of Representatives from Texas
Members of the United States House of Representatives from Mississippi
People from Aberdeen, Mississippi
People from Tipton County, Tennessee
American military personnel of the Mexican–American War
Texas Brigade
Burials at Hollywood Cemetery (Richmond, Virginia) 
Burials at Oak Hill Cemetery (Washington, D.C.)
Texas Know Nothings
Mississippi Whigs
Texas Democrats
Whig Party members of the United States House of Representatives
19th-century American politicians